Come Dine with Me New Zealand was a New Zealand television reality programme based on the UK's Come Dine with Me. Narrated by comedian Guy Williams, it premiered on TV3 on 15 June 2015, with the final episode airing on 7 August 2015. Originally planned to air in the late afternoon, it aired at  each weeknight, from two weeks after the discontinuation of 3 News' former current affairs show, Campbell Live, until the launch of Story, its new current affairs show. In November 2015, MediaWorks decided not to renew the series.

Format
Throughout five episodes, aired Monday–Friday, contestants took turns to host a dinner party and marked the other contestants out of 10. The winner of each week won $2000; where there is a tie for first place (as happened in the fifth week), the two winners got $1000 each.

Episodes
Contestants are organised from left to right in the order they hosted their dinner parties. The winner or winners of each week are highlighted in green.

References 

2015 New Zealand television series debuts
2015 New Zealand television series endings
Cooking competitions
Come Dine With Me
English-language television shows
New Zealand television series based on British television series
New Zealand cooking television series
Three (TV channel) original programming